The REHAU Group is a family-owned polymer business, which develops, manufactures and markets products for the automotive, construction, furniture, materials, medical and industrial sectors. Rehau employs more than 20,000 people in over 190 locations. The headquarters for the car and industry business is in Rehau and for Commercial Construction is in Erlangen. The administrative headquarters of the REHAU Group is located in Muri bei Bern, Switzerland.

The turnover of the whole group amounts to approximately €3.4 billion.

History 
Helmut Wagner founded the family business in 1948 in Rehau. In 1962, the first plant outside of Europe was opened in Montreal. In 2000 Helmut Wagner, was the line of the supervisory board from his sons Jobst Wagner and Veit Wagner. Furthermore, REHAU with more than 2,000 jobs to the town's largest employer, Rehau.

In 2004, the medical division with around 200 employees was spun off and founded as the sister company Raumedic AG. It is a development partner and manufacturer for the medical and pharmaceutical industry with an independent sales network and two production sites for extrusion, injection molding and assembly in clean rooms in Helmbrechts and Mills River (North Carolina, USA).

The Supervisory Board of the Rehau Group announced in 2018 that William Christensen had been appointed as the new CEO and Kurt Plattner as the new CFO of REHAU. 

In 2018, the MB Barter & Trading SA (MBT) was taken over by REHAU Verwaltungszentrale AG.

Locations 
The REHAU group has more than 190 locations in 68 countries.

References

Plastics companies of Germany
Auto parts suppliers of Germany
Manufacturing companies established in 1948
1948 establishments in Germany
Companies based in Bavaria